The 2006–07 Mercyhurst Lakers women's ice hockey team represented Mercyhurst College in the 2006–07 NCAA Division I women's ice hockey season. The Lakers were coached by Michael Sisti and went 11-0-1 in their conference. Mercyhurst had the second-best scoring defense in Division I in 2006-2007. It would be the rookie season of Meghan Agosta. She was the first freshman ever to be in the Final 3 for the Patty Kazmaier Award. No other freshman had made it that far in voting.

Regular season
The Lakers made local, regional and national headlines (features in the USA Today and New York Times). In late November, the Lakers were ranked #1 and stayed there for 11 consecutive weeks. In addition, the Lakers accumulated a 24-game unbeaten streak to finish the season (twenty two wins and two losses).

Highlights
October 1: In a game against the Maine Black Bears women's ice hockey program, Valerie Chouinard accumulated five points. In that same game, Julia Colizza accumulated four points.
 October 13: Laura Hosier got her first career assist in 5-2 win over the Clarkson Golden Knights women's ice hockey program
October 21: Against the Dartmouth Big Green women's ice hockey program, Stephanie Bourbeau scored a hat trick.
October 28: Against the Providence Friars women's ice hockey program, Jill Nugent scored her only goal of the season. The Lakers prevailed 4-3. Danielle Ayearst scored the unassisted game-winning goal.
 November 17: Laura Hosier had a season best 31 saves in 4-2 victory over the St. Lawrence Skating Saints women's ice hockey program
January 12: Valerie Chouinard registered a hat trick against CHA rival Wayne State. In that same game, Julia Colizza registered four points versus Wayne State.
February 3: Against CHA rival Niagara, Valerie Chouinard had a five-point game
February 9: In a game against CHA opponent Robert Morris, Stephanie Jones had a multiple-goal game

Players
Stephanie Bourbeau appeared in all 37 games. Statistically, Bourbeau’s 5 game-winning goals were tied for 13th nationally. Her 8 power play goals were tied for 17th. Bourbeau finished the season tied for first all-time in Lakers career points with 130 and finished first in career goals with 67 (both marks since broken). In the CHA, she tied for first in shorthanded goals, and tied for 2nd in game-winning goals. In addition, she was 3d in the CHA in points, tied for 3rd in power play goals, 4th in assists, and tied for 4th in goals.
Laura Hosier appeared in 32 games and managed seven shutouts. Hosier’s 27 wins set a new one-season mark for her career. Nationally, Laura Hosier ranked 2nd in winning percentage (.903), 4th in goals-against-average (1.52), and 10th in save percentage (.921).  After losing to the St. Lawrence Saints on November 18, Hosier went 17-1-2 the rest of the season. Her conference record was 8-0-1.
Jackie Jarrell rejoined the team after a year and-a-half absence due to injury. She played in 31 games, and other than goaltender Laura Hosier, had fewest penalties on team (2 for 4).
Stephanie Jones played in 35 games and tied for 20th nationally by scoring four game-winning goals. In the CHA, she ranked 8th in points, while tying for fourth in goals, and tying for ninth in assists.

Standings

Roster

Schedule

Player stats

Goaltenders

Notable players
In addition to playing for the Lakers, Meghan Agosta was a member of Canada’s Under-22 Team at the 2007 European Air Canada Cup. She was also selected to play for Team Canada at Women’s World Championship in Winnipeg, Alberta. She had a four-goal and five-point game (season bests) against Yale on January 26, and scored a hat trick against Connecticut on January 20. She had at least one point in 31 of 35 games played and had 23 multiple point games and nine multiple-goal games. In addition, she set team one-season marks for goals (38), points (74), game-winning goals (11), and shorthanded goals (6). She was first nationally in goals-per-game (1.09), game-winning goals (11), and points-per-game by a rookie (2.11)
Valerie Chouinard ranked first nationally in power play goals with 17. For the season, Chouinard played in 35 games and ranked second on the team in goals, third in assists, and second in points. With her 17 power play goals, she moved into first place on Mercyhurst’s all-timelist  with 24. She had at least one point in 26 games, highlighted by a seven-game point scoring streak. In the CHA, Chouinard ranked second in points, and goals.

Julia Colizza finished her Lakers career by never missing a game in her career. In addition, she was the team captain.  She finished her career third all-time at Mercyhurst in points (126) and second all-time in assists (79). In her final season, she tied for first in the CHA in assists, 4th in points (tied), and 5th in power play goals (tied).
Ashley Pendleton played in all 37 games during the season. In addition, she never missed a contest in her career. As one of the seniors on the team, she finished with 147 games played (25 goals, 53 assists, 78 points). In team scoring, she ranked second among defenders (she led defenders in goals)

Postseason
Mercyhurst hosted its first-ever Division I NCAA playoff game on March 9, 2007, and, for the third straight year, lost in the quarterfinals, this time to Minnesota Duluth 3-2 in overtime. Once again, the Lakers never trailed until the final horn.

NCAA Hockey tournament

International
The following players represented their country in international tournaments.
 Valerie Chouinard, Laura Hosier, and Stephanie Jones were members of Canada's Under-22 Team at the 2007 European Air Canada Cup

Awards and honors
Meghan Agosta was a Three-time CHA Offensive Player of the Week and seven-time Rookie of the Week. She set Mercyhurst records with a 13-game goal-scoring streak and 16-game point-scoring streak.
Meghan Agosta, led CHA in points
Meghan Agosta, led CHA in goals, and power play goals
Meghan Agosta, Merchyhurst single season record, goals (38), game-winning goals (11), and shorthanded goals (6).
Meghan Agosta, Merchyhurst single season record, points (74)
Meghan Agosta, RBK Hockey/AHCA First Team All-American
Meghan Agosta, Patty Kazmaier Memorial Award Top Three Finalist
Meghan Agosta, CHA Player of the Year
Meghan Agosta, CHA Three Star Player of the Year
Meghan Agosta, All-CHA First Team
Meghan Agosta, 2007 CHA Tournament MVP
Meghan Agosta, USCHO First Team
Meghan Agosta, USCHO All-Rookie Team
Meghan Agosta, USCHO Rookie of the Year
Meghan Agosta, 2007 CHA Rookie of the Year
Meghan Agosta, 2007 CHA All-Rookie Team
Danielle Ayearst, CHA All-Academic Team
 Stephanie Bourbeau: CHA Offensive Player of the Week (Week of October 23)
 Stephanie Bourbeau, CHA All-Academic Team
 Stephanie Bourbeau, Frozen Four Skills Challenge alternate
Valerie Chouinard, All-USCHO Second Team
Valerie Chouinard, CHA First Team
Valerie Chouinard, CHA All-Tournament Team
Valerie Chouinard, CHA All-Academic Team
Valerie Chouinard, USCHO.com Offensive Player of the Week (Week of October 3)
Julia Colizza Named Mercyhurst College Senior Female Athlete of the Year
 Julia Colizza Second Team All-Conference
 Julia Colizza Frozen Four Skills Challenge selection
 Julia Colizza CHA All-Academic Team
 Julia Colizza Co-CHA Student Athlete of the Year.
 Julia Colizza won 2007 Bill Smith Award
Laura Hosier, USCHO.com Defensive Player of the Week (Week of October 24)
Laura Hosier, All-USCHO First Team
Laura Hosier, Patty Kazmaier Award nominee
Laura Hosier, led the CHA in goals-against-average, save percentage, and winning percentage
Laura Hosier, CHA All-Academic Team
Stephanie Jones, CHA All Academic Team
 Jill Nugent, CHA All-Academic Team 
Ashley Pendleton: 2007 First Team All-CHA 
Michael Sisti, USCHO.com Coach of the Year

References

External links
Official Site

Mercyhurst Lakers women's ice hockey seasons
Mercyhurst
Mercy
Mercy